Miss Ecuador 2010 was the 60th anniversary of the Miss Ecuador pageant, held on March 25, 2010 in Cemexpo (Quito) Ecuador. Miss Ecuador 2009 Sandra Vinces from Manabí handed over the crown to her successor Lady Mina from Guayas. The winner represented Ecuador at Miss Universe 2010.

Results

Placements

Special awards

Judges
Macarena Valarezo
Pamela Cortes
Yuli Maiochi
Karla Caicedo
Daniela Kronfle
Fabricio Célleri

Contestants

Notes

Returns
Last Competed in:
1999:
 Bolívar
 Cañar

Withdraws
 Azuay 
 Cotopaxi 
 El Oro 
 Esmeraldas
 Imbabura
 Los Ríos
 Santo Domingo

Did not compete
 Guayas - María José Delgado  
 Pichincha - Karla Andrade

Crossovers
Ana Galarza was Reina de Ambato 2007.
Cynthia Espíndola was Reina de Duran 2009, and Reina de mi Tierra 2009.

References

External links
 https://web.archive.org/web/20171014195707/http://www.missecuador.net/

2010 beauty pageants
Beauty pageants in Ecuador
Miss Ecuador